"I'm Gonna Be Strong" is a song written by the songwriting duo Barry Mann and Cynthia Weil. It was first recorded by Frankie Laine in 1963 and released as a single on Columbia Records. However, the song did not become a major hit until 1964, when Gene Pitney released his version as a single. It was also a single released by the 1980 band Blue Angel, with lead vocals provided by future star Cyndi Lauper. This release was prior to Lauper's solo career; however, Lauper re-recorded the track and released it as a single in 1994. The song was also featured on 1982's Quiet Lies album by Grammy winner Juice Newton. Though Newton never released the song as a single, her remake was later added as a bonus track to her first Greatest Hits collection.

Gene Pitney version

This version was a top ten hit on both the Billboard Hot 100 and the UK Singles Chart. The song is Pitney's biggest UK solo hit, with only his duet version of "Something's Gotten Hold of My Heart" with Marc Almond peaking higher.

Charts

Blue Angel version

It was also the most successful single released by the 1980 band Blue Angel from their only album, also called Blue Angel (1980). The vocals were provided by American singer-songwriter Cyndi Lauper. Like the album, the only country the single charted in was the Netherlands, where it reached #37 on the charts.

The artwork and track listing for the single varied depending on the country of origin. An Italian promotional 7" vinyl single with the same catalogue number and track listing as the German version was released with alternate artwork. The original 1980 Dutch release was re-released with identical packaging in 1984 after Lauper's solo success.

Track listing
 7" vinyl (Netherlands)
 "I'm Gonna Be Strong" – 2:50
 "Just the Other Day" – 2:42

 7" vinyl (Germany)/Italian promo 7" vinyl
 "I'm Gonna Be Strong" – 2:50
 "Maybe He'll Know" – 3:54

 7" vinyl (Australia and UK)
 "I'm Gonna Be Strong" – 2:50
 "Anna Blue" – 3:57

Cyndi Lauper version

Because "I'm Gonna Be Strong" was the most successful single of Lauper's early band Blue Angel, she went on to re-record the track for her first greatest hits album, Twelve Deadly Cyns...and Then Some (1994), and subsequently a new single was released in 1994. The song shows off Lauper's singing ability, containing a challenging arrangement and notes. It peaked in the top 40 on the UK chart. The single was not commercially released in the US, where it was only released as a promo.

Critical reception
David Bauder from Associated Press felt the song is "among her strongest vocal performances". A reviewer from Cox News Service stated that Lauper "still owns one of the most wide-ranging and dynamic voices in pop music." Ian Tasker from The Guardian wrote that the singer's voice is "arguably best displayed" on the single, describing it as "a highly emotional song of a relationship breaking down, it's unusual in as much as it doesn't really have a chorus – it just builds and builds, adding layer upon layer of pain and hurt as Lauper's majestic voice grows stronger and more insistent, higher and higher until it reaches a heartbreaking climax." In his weekly UK chart commentary, James Masterton said, "This new single turns down the tempo and lets Cyndi's voice come to the fore with another of the overwrought ballads she is so fond of." A reviewer from Music Week viewed it as "a dramatic ballad [that] bears Lauper's trademark roar but doesn't perhaps have the hit quality of her more successful work. Gerald Martinez from New Straits Times called it a "broadway style ballad", stating that "she's got a unique voice — too high pitched — with a vast range of dynamics, from a whisper to operatic crescendos. Just listen to her final note".

Music video
The accompanying music video for "I'm Gonna Be Strong" was directed by Lauper herself. It features a lonely Lauper walking around in an old house. She wears a red dress and her hair is curly and strong-yellow, almost orange. In the beginning, the singer stands by a wooden table, making a cup of tea while she sings. The windows are covered with blonde curtains. Other scenes show her glancing out of one window, sitting on a bed or looking at herself in a mirror. The video was later published on Lauper's official YouTube channel in 2009, and had generated more than 2.5 million views as of January 2023.

Track listing

 Europe 2-track CD single
 "I'm Gonna Be Strong" - 3:46
 "A Part Hate" - 4:54

 Europe CD maxi-single / Australian CD single
 "I'm Gonna Be Strong" - 3:46
 "Broken Glass" - 3:52
 "Dear John" - 3:40
 "A Part Hate" - 4:54

 UK CD1
 "I'm Gonna Be Strong" - 3:46
 "Broken Glass" - 5:31
 "Dear John" - 3:37

 UK CD2
 "I'm Gonna Be Strong" - 3:46
 "A Part Hate" - 4:53
 "Product of Misery" - 4:08

 Japan CD single
 "I'm Gonna Be Strong" - 3:50
 "Sally's Pigeons" - 3:46
 "Feels Like Christmas" - 4:36

Charts

Other versions
Jackie DeShannon covered the song on her 1965 album This is Jackie DeShannon.  Del Shannon covered this song on his 1965 album One Thousand Six Hundred Sixty One Seconds.

Tim Rose released the song as single with the B-side "I Got a Loneliness" (Columbia USA 4-43958, 19 Dec 1966) and on his selftitled album 1967.

Juice Newton included the song on her albums Quiet Lies (1982) and Greatest Hits (1984).

Guitarist Ronnie Montrose created an instrumental version of this song on his Territory album (1986).

Dutch singer Glennis Grace covered the song in 1994, peaking at 13 on the Dutch Top 40.

Buddy Miller covered the song on his 1999 album Cruel Moon, with Joy Lynn White on backing vocals.

References

External links
Official Cyndi Lauper website

1963 singles
1964 singles
1980 singles
1994 singles
Songs written by Barry Mann
Frankie Laine songs
Del Shannon songs
Gene Pitney songs
Blue Angel (band) songs
Juice Newton songs
Cyndi Lauper songs
Columbia Records singles
Musicor Records singles
Polydor Records singles
Epic Records singles
Songs with lyrics by Cynthia Weil
1963 songs
Song recordings produced by Roy Halee
Pop ballads